John Cox (21 July 1886 – 12 November 1918) was a British wrestler. He competed in the men's freestyle bantamweight at the 1908 Summer Olympics.

References

External links
 

1886 births
1918 deaths
British male sport wrestlers
Olympic wrestlers of Great Britain
Wrestlers at the 1908 Summer Olympics
Place of birth missing